The 1964–65 1re série season was the 44th season of the 1re série, the top level of ice hockey in France. Five teams participated in the final round, and Chamonix Hockey Club won their 21st league title.

Final round

External links
Season on hockeyarchives.info

France
1964–65 in French ice hockey
Ligue Magnus seasons